is an autobahn in northwestern Germany. Construction of a first,  section started 2002 and was opened on 23 October 2008.

Opened section 

The first section between Stade and Horneburg started construction in 2002. It was opened gradually between 5 August and 23 October 2008.

Part of the second section connecting Horneburg with Jork was finished mid 2014 but open only to west bound motor bikes and passenger cars since 28 November 2014 and east bound since 17 July 2015.

Construction 

The remaining stretch of the second section is under construction and will further connect Jork with Buxtehude and cross the river Este. It is planned to open with the third section.

The third section will connect Buxtehude with Neu Wulmstorf/Rübke. First construction started 5 September 2013. It 

Section four connecting A26 to A7 on Hamburg territory at a new interlink 'Hamburg-Süderelbe' started 2019 and

Planning phase 

A fifth section is planned to connect Stade with Drochtersen and the planned extension of the A20 across the river Elbe.

The so-called 'Hafenpassage' is planned as an east–west connection south of the Elbe between A7, A253 and A1. It will involve a new bridge to replace the aging Köhlbrand Bridge.

Exit list

|-
|colspan="3"|

|-
|colspan="3"|

|}

References

External links 

26
A026
A026
Proposed roads in Germany